15 Delphini (15 Del) is a star in the equatorial constellation Delphinus. It has an apparent magnitude of 5.99, allowing it to be faintly seen with the naked eye.

15 Del has a stellar classification of F5 V, indicating that it is an ordinary F-type main-sequence star.

15 Delphini has 3 companions listed below. Components B and D have different proper motions compared to the host. However, C appears to have a common proper motion, suggesting physical relation,  but its parallax indicates a further distance compared to 15 Delphini.

References

Delphinus (constellation)
F-type main-sequence stars
BD+12 04472
198390
102805
7973
Double stars
High-proper-motion stars